Inkuchimakhi (Dargwa: Инкъучимахьи) is a rural locality (a selo) in Tsudakharsky Selsoviet, Levashinsky District, Republic of Dagestan, Russia. The population was 537 as of 2010. There are 4 streets.

Geography 
Inkuchimakhi is located 26 km southwest of Levashi (the district's administrative centre) by road, on the Kazikumukhskoye Koysu River. Kumamakhi and Tsudakhar are the nearest rural localities.

Nationalities 
Dargins live there.

References 

Rural localities in Levashinsky District